The Melting of Maggie Bean is a children's novel by Tricia Rayburn, published in 2007. The book follows the titular Maggie Bean's quest to lose weight and join her school's synchronized swim team.

Plot 
Maggie Bean is the average seventh grader, having a tough year. Her father lost his job, and her mother is stressed about money. So Maggie focuses on keeping up her straight A average and over-consuming chocolate. But it all changes when Maggie gets a chance to try out for the synchronized swim team. Becoming a Water Wing has always been Maggie's dream. She and her friend Aimee work to complete their goal and Maggie might finally stop being a social outcast. Who would not want a cute silver bathing suit, an awesome circle of friends, and the boyfriend of her dreams? But it is all up to Maggie, and who she thinks she is. 
She also is forced to join the "Pound Patrollers", a club of other heavy people, where she meets Arnie, another chunky boy her age who turns out to be Peter (her dream boy's) cousin. She forms a friendship with him. At school, she also gets a little closer to Peter, though not boyfriend-girlfriend close. Her sister, Summer, Aimee, and of course Maggie herself, work to help find her dad a job. She also begins to lose weight and takes nearly 20 pounds off her original 186. She eats less, gets rid of her chocolate, and practices for the Water Wings tryouts, which she eventually nails. However, cocaptains Julia and Anabel keep her off the team, causing Maggie to become depressed. Later, her gym teacher realizes this and offers Maggie a chance to join the Water Wings OR the regular swim team. She chooses the latter. Her dad also makes progress towards getting a job through Maggie's help.

Characters

Maggie Bean
A self-conscious seventh grader whose father has recently lost his job. Because of this, Maggie goes from 149 pounds to 186 and that's not good when you're 5' 7".  Her measurements are 42-34-44. Maggie is a straight-A student. Maggie has a crush on Peter Applewood, a baseball player. Maggie dislikes Anabel Richards and Julia Swanson, the captains of the Water Wings, but she envies them for their bodies and popularity. To deal with the stress of her father losing his job, Maggie does what she knows best: she gobbles chocolate and get straight A's.

Peter Applewood
A popular, good looking baseball player and Maggie's crush. He's quite nice to Maggie and is her locker neighbor at school. Aimee thinks he may like Julia Swanson, though it's revealed she was actually just stalking him and only thought they were going out.

Arnie
Peter Applewood's cousin and a boy that Maggie met at the Pound Patrollers. Arnie is also overweight like Maggie and he plays the flute. He hopes to start a business someday.

Aimee McDougall
Maggie's well-intentioned, athletic best friend who encourages her to try out for the Water Wings. She's prettier and skinnier than Maggie and has a long list of admirers, but still sticks up for Maggie and helps her.

"Anabel Richards and Julia Swanson" the popular queens of the seventh grade and also the cocaptains of Water Wings. Julia seems to be the more evil one, who more openly mocks Maggie and tries to get Peter, while Anabel seems a little nicer, as at the Water Wings tryouts she actually encourages Maggie and seems to express a little guilt at keeping her off the team.

Summer Bean
Maggie's encouraging younger sister. She's ten years old.

 Aunt Violetta
Maggie's overweight aunt who convinces Maggie to try the Pound Patrollers to lose weight.

Development and publication
University when she began the novel. One of her elective classes was Reading and Writing Children's Literature, for which the final assignment was to write the first thirty pages of a young adult novel. Using her own childhood for inspiration, Rayburn came up with the image of a girl in a store trying to decide which candy she should buy.

After she completed the assignment Rayburn continued to work on the novel for her own enjoyment and eventually finished a first draft, which became her MFA thesis. Having not considered it before, Rayburn was struck by a sudden thought during a meeting with her MFA adviser and asked whether she should seek publication. She sent out several query letters to agents, without expecting a result, and received her first reply two days later.

Rayburn signed with the Writers House agency and began to revise the novel with the help of her agent, Rebecca Sherman. Until this time, the character of Maggie Bean had been called Lucy Moon, but Rayburn had to change it because someone else was already using the name in their novel. Once this and other changes had been made, the novel was sent out to editors; it was accepted by Simon & Schuster and published as one of the six launch titles for their new Aladdin MIX imprint.

Reception

Entertainment Weekly, Kliatt and Teens Read Too all applauded the novel for its realism.

Rayburn's characterisation came in for particular praise, with Kliatt saying of Maggie that "her personality practically jumps off the page", and that the supporting characters are "nuanced" and "just as well-throughout". Entertainment Weekly described the titular character as "a resourceful, likeable kid" but felt that she is "simply drawn".

School Library Journal called the novel "thoughtful" and "empowering", while Kliatt thought it "engaging, earnest". Teens Read Too said it "will inspire readers everywhere", rating the book as "5 Stars" and gaving it a Gold Award. Entertainment Weekly graded the book as a "B".

References

2007 American novels
American children's novels
2007 children's books
Aladdin Paperbacks books